Knowledge and Explanation in History: An Introduction to the Philosophy of History is a 1978 book by Ronald Field Atkinson in which the author tries to provide an introductory text in philosophy of history. The book was reviewed by Rex Martin, Patrick Nowell-Smith, William H. Dray and L. Gordon Graham.

References

External links 
 Knowledge and Explanation in History: An Introduction to the Philosophy of History

1978 non-fiction books
English-language books
Books about the philosophy of history
Philosophy textbooks
Cornell University Press books